Chazaria incarnata is a species of moth of the family Noctuidae. It is found on the Canary Islands and on the Iberian Peninsula, east to Italy, Serbia, Romania, Bulgaria, North Macedonia and Greece. Further east it is found to southern and eastern Russia in the north and Turkey, the Dead Sea region of Israel and Iran.

Adults are on wing from July to August.

External links
 
 Fauna Europaea

Heliothinae
Moths of Europe
Moths of Asia
Moths of the Middle East